Belle et Sébastien is a 1966 novel by Cécile Aubry about a six-year-old boy named Sébastien and his dog Belle, a Great Pyrenees, who live in a village in the French Alps close to the Italian border. Sébastien lives with his adopted grandfather, sister, and brother, as his mother, a Romani, died after giving birth to him while trying to cross the border on Saint Sebastian's day. The novel, known in English-speaking countries as Belle and Sebastian, is based on a 1965 French live action television series. The novel itself spawned a Japanese anime adaptation in 1981, a French motion picture in 2013, followed by two sequels in 2015 and 2017 (Belle and Sebastian: Friends for Life), and a French-Canadian co-produced TV series in 2017.

Source TV serial

Belle et Sébastien (1965–1970) 

The source of the novel was filmed in France as live action in black and white. The BBC dubbed it into English, and anglicized the title to "Belle and Sebastian", and it became a favourite on children's television, shown a few times.

Adaptations
The serial spawned two further 13-part colour film sequels: Sebastien parmi les Hommes (Sebastien Among Men, 1968), retitled Belle, Sebastian and the Horses by the BBC and Sebastien et la Mary-Morgane (Sebastian and the Mary Morgan) (1970); this second sequel was not broadcast by the BBC.

The Scottish indie pop band Belle & Sebastian took their name from the TV series.

Meiken Jolie (1981) 

The anime version, released initially under its Japanese name of Meiken Jolie, was created in 1980, a joint production of MK Company, Visual 80 Productions and Toho Company, Ltd., with animation director Toshiyuki Kashiwakura helming the project and character designs from Shuichi Seki. The show was broadcast on French, Italian and Japanese television in 1981, with American cable network Nickelodeon picking it up in 1984.

Belle et Sébastien (2013 motion picture) 

In 2013 the novel was filmed again by director Nicolas Vanier (original title: Belle et Sébastien) targeting a family audience, but placing it at the French–Swiss border Haute-Maurienne–Vanoise in 1943 and adding a storyline about fugitives crossing the mountains to the child-friendly boy-befriends-dog story.

Belle et Sébastien: l'aventure continue (2015 motion picture) 

A sequel to the 2013 film (original title: Belle et Sébastien: l'aventure continue), set in 1945 and directed by Canadian director Christian Duguay, was released on December 9, 2015.

Belle et Sébastien (2017) 

A production by Gaumont Animation, shown on Knowledge, in British Columbia.

References

1965 children's books
1965 French novels
Children's novels about animals
French adventure novels
French children's novels
French novels adapted into films
Novels about dogs
French novels adapted into television shows